Bashmur was a region in the Nile Delta in Egypt. In the early Middle Ages, it was inhabited by Christian Copts and was the scene of a series of revolts against Arab rule in the 8th and 9th centuries.

Name 
Louis Picques, a late-17th century scholar, suggested that the name Bashmur could be derived from Psamer, which he interpreted as "at the borders or boundaries of a region," or Psamour ("opposite of Moeris"). Thomas Edwards provided another explanation, suggesting that it could be linked to a Semitic term for "north". This word is also found in Coptic as a hapax.

The name could be also an outcome of Ptimyris, the ancient name of the Delta, which could represent an elliptical Coptic expression Pčimour, for pi-Kahi Etčimour.

Location 
The boundaries of Bashmur have not been constant throughout the centuries. Perhaps from the mid-eighth to the mid-ninth century, Bashmur encompassed the entire marsh region northeast of Fuwwah extending as far to the east as just north of Dekernes. Later it may have been limited to the eastern part of this area. In the 10th century, Ibn Hawqal equated the lake of Nastaruh (Lake Burullus) with the lake of Bashmur. In the 14th century, Abu al-Fida located Bashmur in the northeast of the Delta between Damietta and Ashmun El Rumman.

The name Bashmur survives in this region as the name of a Nile canal that breaks off about 4.5 miles (7 km) east of Mansoura, Egypt by El Salamun and runs through the area between the Damietta arm of the Nile and Dekernes before emptying into the El Sirw canal some 3.5 miles (5.5 km) south of Dakahlia.

Society and economy
Bashmur was a region of marshland with sand banks and dense cover of reeds. Nowhere else in Egypt was more propitious for armed rebellion. Access to inhabited places was provided through narrow sandy banks and the reeds provided cover for soldiers. Moreover, Arabs did not settle in the Bashmur, leaving the population religiously unmixed. The economy of the region also favoured the Bashmurians, who relied on limited agriculture, fishing and hunting birds for food. Less dependent on irrigation works than the fellahin, they were capable of resisting long sieges. The Bashmurians also sold papyrus and possibly raised cattle.

See also 
 Persecution of Copts

Notes

Bibliography 

 Maspero, J., and G. Wiet (1914-1919). Matériaux pour servir à la géographie de l'Egypte. Cairo.

 Timm, S. (1984) Das christlich-koptische Ägypten in arabischer Zeit, Vol. 1, pp. 354-56. Wiesbaden.

Regions of Africa
Historical regions
Persecution of Copts
Geography of Egypt
Regions of Egypt